The Creator (Le créateur) is a 1999 French film written and directed by and starring Albert Dupontel.

Plot
Darius is a playwright who lost his inspiration but agreed to write a new play for a producer. A few months later he discovers that the play promotion has started, and that actors have been cast and are ready to rehearse a text he has not been able to write so far.

Cast
 Claude Perron as Chloé Duval
 Albert Dupontel as Darius
 Philippe Uchan as Victor
 Michel Vuillermoz as Simon
 Nicolas Marié as Pierre
 Paul Le Person as Monsieur Le Floc'h
 Patrick Ligardes as Gildas
 Dominique Bettenfeld as Jesus
 Terry Jones as God
 Michel Fau as Nicolas
 Isabelle Candelier as The journalist
 Christiane Cohendy as The mother
 Yves Pignot as The father
 Jacques Herlin as Le Majordome

References

External links
 

1990s French-language films
1999 films
French comedy films
Films directed by Albert Dupontel
1990s French films